The Independence-class aircraft carriers were a class of light carriers built for the United States Navy that served during World War II.

Development
Adapted from the design for the  light cruisers, this class of ship resulted from the interest of President Franklin D. Roosevelt in naval air power. With war looming, Roosevelt, a former Assistant Secretary of the Navy, noted no new fleet aircraft carriers were expected to be completed before 1944. He proposed to convert some of the many cruisers then under construction to carriers. Studies of cruiser-size aircraft carriers had shown the type had serious limitations, and on 13 October 1941, the General Board of the United States Navy replied that such a conversion showed too many compromises to be effective.

Undeterred, President Roosevelt ordered another study. On 25 October 1941, the Navy's Bureau of Ships reported that aircraft carriers converted from cruiser hulls would be of lesser capability, but available much sooner. After the December 1941 attack on Pearl Harbor, the need for more carriers became urgent. The Navy accelerated construction of the 34,000-ton s, but these large ships could not be finished quickly. The Cleveland-class light cruisers then under construction were adopted for this purpose.

Plans developed for this conversion showed much more promise than expected. Nine light cruisers were reordered as carriers in the first half of 1942. The Independence-class design had a relatively short and narrow flight deck and hangar, with a small island superstructure. The hangar, flight deck, and island represented a significant increase in the ship's topside weight. Ships of this class carried a small air group – only about 30 aircraft. This was originally set to consist of nine fighters, nine scout bombers, and nine torpedo bombers, but later revised to about two dozen fighters and nine torpedo bombers.

These were limited-capability ships, whose principal virtue was near-term availability.  Their limited size made for seakeeping difficulties in the many typhoons of the Pacific, and their small flight decks led to a high aircraft accident rate. However, being based on a light cruiser, they were fast ships, much faster than the s.  The cruiser hull and engineering allowed them the speed necessary to operate with the main fleet carrier task groups. Their names followed the US Navy's policy of naming aircraft carriers after historic navy ships (Independence) or historic battles (Cowpens).

Service
Completed in the course of 1943, and coming into service with the first eight of the Essex-class carriers, the nine Independence-class ships made up a vital component of the Fast Carrier Task Force, which carried the Navy's offensive through the central and western Pacific from November 1943 through August 1945. Eight of these carriers participated in the Battle of the Philippine Sea in June 1944, which effectively ended Japan's carrier air power.  The light carriers provided 40 percent of the Fast Carrier Task Force's fighters and 36 percent of the torpedo bombers.  The protection on these carriers was modest, and munitions often had to be stowed at the hangar level, a factor that contributed greatly to the loss of Princeton in October 1944.

Ships in class

The nine ships of the Independence class were all converted from Cleveland-class light cruisers building at the New York Shipbuilding Corporation shipyard, Camden, New Jersey. Initially classified as "aircraft carriers" (CV), all were re-designated "small aircraft carriers" (CVL) on 15 July 1943 while four ships were still under construction.

 Independence (CV/CVL-22) – Postwar, she was surplus to the Navy's requirements and expended in the nuclear test Operation Crossroads in July 1946. The ship survived both tests with little damage. She was used as a radiation research hulk for several years afterward and expended as a target in January 1951.
 Princeton (CV/CVL-23) – Destroyed as a result of Japanese air attack 24 October 1944 during Battle of Leyte Gulf.
 Belleau Wood (CV/CVL-24) –  Decommissioned to reserve in January, 1947. Returned to the US Navy for scrapping September 1960.
 Cowpens (CV/CVL-25) – Decommissioned to reserve in January, 1947.  Stricken and scrapped starting November 1959.
 Monterey (CV/CVL-26) – Decommissioned to reserve February 1947.  Recommissioned as training carrier September 1950, decommissioned to reserve again January 1956.  Re-designated aircraft transport AVT-2 May 1959. Stricken June 1970.
 Langley CVL-27 – Decommissioned to reserve February 1947. Returned to USN and stricken March 1963, scrapped at Baltimore in 1964.
 Cabot CVL-28 – Decommissioned to reserve February 1947, recommissioned and modernised as anti-submarine warfare (ASW) carrier October 1948. Stricken from Naval Vessel Register and sold to Spain August 1972. Decommissioned for preservation at New Orleans August 1989, preservation efforts failed. Scrapped at Brownsville, Texas starting October 2000.
 Bataan CVL-29 – Decommissioned to reserve February 1947, recommissioned and modernised as ASW carrier May 1950.  Decommissioned to reserve April 1954.  Stricken for scrapping September 1959.
San Jacinto CVL-30 – Decommissioned to reserve March 1947.  Stricken June 1970.

Disposal

There was little margin for growth, as the ships' post-war careers showed. Independence was expended as an atomic bomb target, and the rest were laid up in 1947. Five returned to service in 1948–53, two with the French Navy. Two were used as training carriers, while Bataan saw Korean War combat duty with Marine Corps air groups. She and Cabot received anti-submarine warfare modernizations in the early 1950s, emerging with two funnels instead of the original four. All but the French ships were decommissioned in 1954–56 and were reclassified as aircraft transports in 1959. Cabot got a new lease on life in 1967, when she became the Spanish Navy's carrier Dédalo, serving until 1989 (in Spanish service, she was the first carrier to regularly deploy the Harrier jump jet). Despite efforts to preserve her, Cabot was scrapped at Brownsville in 1999–2003.  Preservation efforts continued until the hull was half scrapped.

See also 
  – Japanese cruiser converted into a light aircraft carrier (not completed)

References

Bibliography
Faltum, Andrew  The Independence Class Aircraft Carriers, Nautical & Aviation Publishing, 
 

Light aircraft carrier classes
 
 Independence-class aircraft carriers
 Independence-class aircraft carriers
 Independence-class aircraft carriers
New York Shipbuilding Corporation
Ship classes of the French Navy